Matías González Laicovsky (born 20 February 1992) is a Uruguayan footballer who plays as a defender. He is currently a free agent.

Career
González had youth spells with Durazno in Uruguay and Crucero del Norte in Argentina between 2007 and 2009. In 2009, González joined Uruguayan Segunda División side Rocha. He subsequently made eight professional appearances for the club. In 2012, González scored one goal in eleven matches for Atenas in the Segunda División. During the 2013–14 campaign, González joined his third second tier team in Torque. He made his debut on 5 April 2014 in a 6–0 victory versus Progreso. Nine appearances later, he left Torque.

Career statistics
.

References

External links

1992 births
Living people
Place of birth missing (living people)
Uruguayan footballers
Association football defenders
Uruguayan Segunda División players
Rocha F.C. players
Atenas de San Carlos players
Montevideo City Torque players